Brandon Young (born November 16, 1991) is an American professional basketball player for BC CSKA Sofia of the Bulgarian basketball league. After four years at DePaul University, Young entered the 2014 NBA draft but was not selected in the draft's two rounds.

High school career
Randallstown High School class of 2009

College career 
Young chose to play college basketball at DePaul after finishing high school at Friendship Collegiate Academy. At DePaul, he is the only player in program history with at least 1,200 points, 400 assists and 100 three-pointers. He is also the only player in program history with at least 100 assists in all four seasons. In his four seasons in the college, Young scored 102 career games in double-figures and reached double-figures in 81 percent of games (102-of-126). Also he had 31 games of at least 20 points including two games of 30 or more points.

Professional career
After going undrafted in the 2014 NBA draft, Young was acquired from the Texas Legends of the NBA Development League on January 14, 2015. He averaged 6 points and 2,2 assists.

In September 2015, he signed with Lavrio of the Greek Basket League. He went on to average 12.1 points, 3.1 rebounds, 2.7 assists and 1 steals in 24 games for Lavrio. He re-signed with the team for the 2016–17 season. He left the team after the arrival of Steven Gray at the club. On December 15, he joined BBC Monthey of the Swiss League. With Monthey, Young won the Swiss Cup, scoring 14 points at the final against Fribourg Olympic.

On October 9, 2017, Young signed with Champville of the Lebanese Basketball League. On January 31, 2018, he moved to Kolossos Rodou of the Greek Basket League.

On July 14, 2020, he has signed with Kyiv-Basket of the Ukrainian Basketball SuperLeague.

On June 30, 2021, he has signed with Trefl Sopot of the Polish Basketball League. Young averaged 11.1 points, 3.6 rebounds, 4.8 assists, and 1.3 steals per game. He parted ways with the team on February 17, 2022.

On February 21, 2022, he has signed with Szolnoki Olaj of the Hungarian NB I/A.

References

External links 
RealGM.com Profile
DePaul Blue Demons profile

1991 births
Living people
American expatriate basketball people in Greece
American expatriate basketball people in Lebanon
American expatriate basketball people in Poland
American expatriate basketball people in Switzerland
American expatriate basketball people in Ukraine
American men's basketball players
Basketball players from Baltimore
BBC Monthey players
BC Cherkaski Mavpy players
DePaul Blue Demons men's basketball players
Kolossos Rodou B.C. players
Lavrio B.C. players
Point guards
Shooting guards
Texas Legends players
Trefl Sopot players